The Tampico Bridge is a vehicular cable-stayed bridge connecting the Mexican states of Tamaulipas and Veracruz in eastern Mexico.

Geography
The bridge crosses the Pánuco River near the coast of the Gulf of Mexico. 

It connects the city of Tampico in Tamaulipas and Pueblo Viejo Municipality in Veracruz.

Design and engineering
The bridge has been in service since 1988 and was designed by Professor Modesto Armijo from COMEC, a Mexican engineering company. It was designed to withstand the severe Atlantic hurricanes from the Gulf of Mexico.

Both steel and concrete deck girders have the same external shape. This original design principle was later used for the  main span of the Pont de Normandie, a cable-stayed bridge in Normandy, France.

The dynamic analysis of the bridge under turbulent cyclonic winds, as well as the revision of the structural project, and the geometry plus stress control of the bridge during erection, were achieved by Alain Chauvin from Sogelerg, using the French "Scanner" computer program.

Toll
The bridge is tolled by Caminos y Puentes Federales, which charges cars 32 pesos to use it.

Gallery

References

External links

Cable-stayed bridges in Mexico
Buildings and structures in Tamaulipas
Buildings and structures in Veracruz
Pánuco River
Tampico
Transportation in Tamaulipas
Transportation in Veracruz
Bridges completed in 1988
1988 establishments in Mexico